T. R. Mahalingam is the name of:
 T. R. Mahalingam (actor) (1923–1978)
 T. R. Mahalingam (flautist) (1926–1986)
 Mali (cartoonist)